Debre Metmik Tsadkane Mariam Monastery, also simply known as Tsadkane Mariam Monastery, is an Ethiopian Orthodox Tewahedo monastery located in mountainous region in Sela Dingay, in North Shewa Zone of Oromia Region, around  northeast of Addis Ababa. The site is surrounded by trees approached from the northwest and above. 

The church has unique architecture of chambers, rooms and walls and most pilgrimages are frequented to this monastery.

Description
A square-shaped, the church is carved to north-east face, where several steps rise within the courtyard to the church. The courtyard consists of built structure and access from the southwest. A small carved chamber is founded between the church and prayer chamber. The church has two doors and small windows in which the one placed in the left of entrance. In its square plan, there are four primary spaces, each roughly square in plan, resulting cruciform wall at the center of the plan. 

The central column and pilaster separate all sections, except the two northeast chambers. All three columns are roughly square in plan  and the curtain hanged to the first two chambers. An integrated seating connects the base of most walls, the chamber in the left entrance of the church includes square protrusion from the southeast wall.

The second bay, deepened with the rock, raised by steps and reached through arched entrances. In the far left, the south chamber forms nave which is raised slightly higher above the northwest chamber. The nave includes a large rock-hewn tabots and tabot Maryam. The ceiling is relatively flat despite differ from height.

Prayer chamber description
The prayer chamber is carved to north-east cliff face, immediately to the right of the church. The path widened in the praying chamber while descending from above, as slope below terraced where laity occupies available space.

The rectangular window is located in the left side of entrance of the church; the rectangular entrance raised by two stairs guides to the chamber and the chamber widens within the rock and contains two square columns, to form a space three bays in width and two in depth. The shallow niches are carved on the southeast and southwest wall and the roof sloped and rises gradually within the rock.

The northwest bay covered with curtains is reserved for priests. The right side of prayer chamber appeared to facade, is entrance to carved storage chamber, which connects to northwest bay of the prayer chamber. In left side of southwest of the prayer chamber, several stairs rise to wall courtyard in front of the church.

Location
It is located in the south-east of Sela Dengay and the site is surrounded by trees approached from the northwest and above.

Washington Planning Commission
In March 2022, the Worthington Planning Commission approved a recommendation from the church to operate in The Global Office Building at 300 11th Street in conditional use permit. In 2018, the group denied a conditional use permit to build on property located across from Oslon Park. Instead, the church purchased  of land in the city of Worthington located along Nobles County 57, near Lakeside Travel Plaza. However, the church was unable to build on the property due to fund restraining and change in their membership.

References

Ethiopian Orthodox Tewahedo monasteries
Christian monasteries in Ethiopia
Churches in Ethiopia